Coelioxys nitidoscutellaris is a species of leaf-cutting bee in the genus Coelioxys, of the family Megachilidae.

It is found in South Asia.

References

External links
 http://www.atlashymenoptera.net/biblio/Karunaratne_et_al_2006_Sri_Lanka.pdf
 https://www.academia.edu/7390502/AN_UPDATED_CHECKLIST_OF_BEES_OF_SRI_LANKA_WITH_NEW_RECORDS
 https://www.itis.gov/servlet/SingleRpt/SingleRpt?search_topic=TSN&search_value=760738

nitidoscutellaris
Hymenoptera of Asia
Insects of India
Insects of Sri Lanka
Insects described in 1987